Maire Yvonne Owen (28 July 1923 – December 1990) was a British stage and film actress.

Life and career
Born in London in 1923, she was married to Alan Badel for 40 years; they had a daughter Sarah. 

In 1946 she appeared in the West End melodrama But for the Grace of God by Frederick Lonsdale.

She died in Chichester in December 1990, aged 67.

Filmography

Film

Theatre

References

External links

1923 births
1990 deaths
British film actresses
20th-century British actresses